Kenneth Thomas Chee Chee  (26 March 1944 – 14 March 1977), known as Benjamin Chee Chee, was an Ojibwa Canadian artist born in Temagami, Ontario.

Early life
Chee Chee's early life was troubled and he lost track of his mother, for whom he spent many years searching. He moved to Montreal in 1965 where he developed his love of drawing, and moved back to Ottawa in 1973.

Career
Chee Chee's first exhibition was held in 1973 at the University of Ottawa. Soon after he gained fame as he developed his unique style of clear graceful lines and minimal colour, depicting birds and animals. Though his art featured a great deal of iconography often used by Canadian First Nations artists, Chee Chee had denied his art had symbolic meaning. He instead referred to the animals featured in his art as "creatures of the present". He also specifically referred to himself as an Ojibway artist, as opposed to allowing himself to be categorized under the broader net of simply an "Indian" artist.

Death
After finding his mother and achieving success as an artist, Chee Chee died by suicide in an Ottawa jail in 1977. He was buried in Notre Dame Cemetery in Ottawa, Ontario. Chee Chee's work has been exhibited posthumously throughout Canada.

Legacy
Chee Chee has been mentioned in Canada's Parliament & House of Commons by MP Robert-Falcon Ouellette in a tribute to the artist about his influence.

Ouellette said "Let us also recognize one of the finest artists of Canada, Benjamin Chee Chee. He always refused to be an indigenous artist; he was a proud Anishnabeg. He drew simple lines, usually acrylic on paper. Highly influential in his time, he said he did not paint the past but the present, the living of today. We can see his works, like the flock of four geese. They represent the four directions of the unborn, the youth, the adults and the elders all moving in the same direction. Even though he died in tragedy and is buried in Ottawa, far from his land and people, he still inspires today." https://openparliament.ca/debates/2019/5/2/robert-falcon-ouellette-3/only/

Anthony Rota, Speaker of the House of Commons and Member of Parliament (Nipissing–Timiskaming) announced that the Government of Canada is investing $97,200 in the Temiskaming Art Gallery to support its exhibit of the work of Ojibwa artist Benjamin Chee Chee. Mr. Rota made the announcement on behalf of the Honourable Pablo Rodriguez, Minister of Canadian Heritage and Multiculturalism. The investment was made through the Access to Heritage component of the Museums Assistance Program, will allow the "Benjamin Chee Chee: Life and Legacy Tour" to travel to communities throughout Northern Ontario over the next three years. This funding promotes collaboration in the preservation of Indigenous culture and helps support the Government of Canada's commitment to reconciliation.

The is a park named after him (Benjamin Chee Chee Park) in Milton, Ontario.re

References

Sources

External links 
 Benjamin Chee Chee on-line cemetery
 Benjamin Chee Chee art sold recently at auctions

Ojibwe people
1944 births
1977 suicides
First Nations painters
Artists who committed suicide
Suicides by hanging in Ontario
Canadian people who died in prison custody
Prisoners who died in Canadian detention
People who committed suicide in prison custody
Artists from Ontario
20th-century Canadian painters
Canadian male painters
Woodlands style
People from Temagami
20th-century Canadian male artists
Burials at Notre-Dame Cemetery (Ottawa)